Zenta Gastl-Kopp (born 29 December 1933) is a German hurdler. She competed in the women's 80 metres hurdles at the 1956 Summer Olympics.

References

1933 births
Living people
Athletes (track and field) at the 1956 Summer Olympics
Athletes (track and field) at the 1960 Summer Olympics
German female hurdlers
Olympic athletes of the United Team of Germany
Place of birth missing (living people)